Vana-Võidu is a settlement in Viljandi Parish, Viljandi County in southern Estonia.

Olympic wrestler Küllo Kõiv (1972–1998) was born in Vana-Võidu.

Gallery

References

External links 
Satellite map at Maplandia.com

Villages in Viljandi County
Kreis Fellin